Anna Martha Sofia Wahlgren ( Karlsson, 6 October 1942 – 7 October 2022) was a Swedish author and public debater.

Wahlgren was best known for her book Barnaboken, which was published in 1983. She also wrote novels, short story collections, poems, a children's book and an autobiography in three parts and was sometimes controversial participant in public debate about child rearing.

Early life and career
Wahlgren was born on 6 October 1942. She was the daughter of master builder Harry Karlsson and restaurant manager Marianne Wahlgren; they divorced in 1950. She was the younger half-sister of photographer Stig T. Karlsson and builder Sven-Harry Karlsson. Wahlgren graduated from Viggbyholmsskolan in Täby in 1961 and attended Witzansky's theater school between 1962 and 1963. 

Wahlgren made her debut as a writer in 1968 with the short story collection En av kvällarna i november (One of the Evenings in November) and the children's book Burken. She broke through with the novel Veka livet with a high edition for her time. Her most famous book, Barnaboken, published in 1983, has been published in several editions and translated into a number of languages.

In addition to her writing, Wahlgren has been a columnist in the weekly and daily press, including for Hemmets Journal between 1972 and 1976 and Aftonbladet in 1977. She was a Summer presenter on the radio program Sommar 1991. Wahlgren has also written plays for radio and television. TV2 has performed the play I väntrummet (In the waiting room) and four chamber plays Äkta makar (Real spouses).

Personal life and death
Wahlgren was the mother of seven daughters and one son, to three husbands. One son died shortly after birth. Wahlgren was married seven times.

Among Wahlgren's nine children are literary critic Sara Danius in her first marriage, author Felicia Feldt and game developer Linus Feldt in her second marriage, and cookbook author Eleonora von Essen in her fourth marriage.

Wahlgren died on 7 October 2022 at her home in Goa, India, one day after turning 80.

Bibliography
En av kvällarna i november, noveller, 1968, Bonniers
Burken, barnbok, 1968, Bonniers Juniorförlag
Bilder från lustgården, noveller, 1969, Bonniers
Veka livet, roman, 1970, Bonniers
Ge liv, roman, 1973, Bonniers
Den sjunde vintern, roman, 1975, Bonniers
Man borde inte sova, 1976, Hemmets Journals bokförlag
Fem pjäser för amatörteaterbruk, antologi,(Resan till Fagersta), 1977, Författarförlaget
Men icke hade kärlek, noveller, 1977, Bonniers
Jordens barn, prosapoesi, 1978, Hemmets Journals bokförlag
Två människors rike, roman, 1978, Bonniers
Lust och Längtan, noveller, 1978, Bonniers
Mannen i kjol, satir, 1980, Bonniers
Utan dig, diktberättelse, 1981, Bonniers
I kärlekens namn, 1985, Bonniers
 , 1983
Fråga Anna om barn, föräldrarådgivning, 1986, Allerbok
Rosengården, roman, 1986, Bonniers
Sorgen, roman, 1987, Bonniers
Dagbok, kvinnoberättelser, 1989, Bonniers
Mommo – Det var en gång, memoarer, del 1, 1995, Sellin&Partner
Lill-Babs – Hon är jag, biografi, 1996, Bra Böcker
Mommo – Kvinnoliv, memoarer del 2, 1996 Sellin&Partner
Mommo – Barnfota, memoarer del 3, 1997, Sellin&Partner
En saga om kärlek, hängmattesåpa, 2002, Bonnier Carlsen
Anna Wahlgren Online, föräldrarådgivning, 2002, Bonnier Carlsen
Barnaboken, reviderad internationell nyutgåva, 2004, Bonnier Carlsen
Sova hela natten (med dvd), 2005, Förlag Anna Wahlgren AB
 
 
 
 
 
 
 
 E-bok: Hem - Internationella Sova hela natten (2011).

References

External links

1942 births
2022 deaths
20th-century Swedish novelists
20th-century Swedish women writers
21st-century Swedish novelists
21st-century Swedish women writers
Swedish children's writers
Swedish fantasy writers
Swedish-language writers
Swedish women children's writers
People from Lund
Writers from Scania